Pyrausta perparvula is a moth in the family Crambidae. It was described by Koen V. N. Maes in 2009. It is found in Tanzania.

References

Endemic fauna of Tanzania
Moths described in 2009
perparvula
Moths of Africa